Podrzecze  is a village in the administrative district of Gmina Piaski, within Gostyń County, Greater Poland Voivodeship, in west-central Poland.

In the vicinity of today's village of Podrzecze, about 100 graves (dating from around the 12th century BC) have been discovered in the area. Often the deceased were put on a pyre and in the grave the items he used in his life. Nearly 140 different types of items were found. There were also animal graves - it is one of six animal mass graves in Poland dating back to the Lusatian culture, including the only one in Poland for horses.

The village has a population of 284.

References

Podrzecze